C/2009 R1 (McNaught), one of more than fifty comets known as Comet McNaught, is a non-periodic comet discovered by British-Australian astronomer Robert H. McNaught on September 9, 2009, using the Uppsala Southern Schmidt Telescope at Siding Spring Observatory in New South Wales, Australia. The discovery was confirmed the same day at the Optical Ground Station telescope at Tenerife. After the discovery, earlier images of the comet were found from July 20, August 1, and August 18, 2009. It is believed C/2009 R1 will leave the Solar System permanently.

Viewing 
In early June 2010, C/2009 R1 was visible with binoculars in the constellations Andromeda and Perseus, and by June 8 it was visible to the unaided eye in a dark sky with little light pollution. Astronomers predicted the comet to grow brighter and become widely visible in the northern hemisphere to the unaided eye by mid- or late-June, at which time it appeared between the constellations Auriga and Gemini. Because the new moon on June 12 provided a particularly dark night sky, the weekend of Friday, June 11 to Sunday, June 13 was expected to be the best time to view the comet, and it was expected to be "an easy skywatching target for most people." Late the following week, the comet remained "easy to spot in binoculars".

Cometary brightness is difficult to predict, especially when, as in this case, it is the first known appearance of the comet; so far C/2009 R1 is proving to be brighter than expected, so much so that Sky and Telescope retitled an online article from "Faint Comet in the June dawn" to "Comet in the June dawn". C/2009 R1 is expected to eventually reach a brightness as high as magnitude 2 from June 30 to July 2, 2010, the latter date marking perihelion; however, as it brightens, its proximity to the Sun will make it difficult to see, and it is likely to only be visible near the horizon at dawn and dusk. The exception to this will be the total solar eclipse on July 11 in the Southern Hemisphere (visible in the South Pacific, touching land at Mangaia, Easter Island, and far southern Chile and Argentina), which will allow the comet to be seen during the day. The comet is notable for its "impressive green coma and long ion tail", which spanned 5 degrees as of June 6, 2010, and its appearance has been likened to an "apple on a stick." By June 13, a second tail created by dust from the comet, was also visible, sharing the same green hue of the coma. The green colors in the coma are caused by the presence of cyanogen and diatomic carbon, while bluish hues in the ion tail are produced by positively charged carbon monoxide and carbon dioxide ions.

References

External links 

 NASA Jet Propulsion Laboratory Small-Body Database Browser on C/2009 R1
 NASA Astronomy Picture of the Day:
 June 17, 2010, Comet McNaught Passes NGC 1245
 June 7, 2010, Comet McNaught Becoming Visible to the Unaided Eye
 Comet C/2009 R1 (McNaught) in Andromeda
 Comet C/2009 R1 (McNaught) - Animation & Images (disconnection event 26 May 2010 / Remanzacco Observatory)

Non-periodic comets
20090909